Demon Days is the second studio album by British virtual band Gorillaz. It was first released on 11 May 2005 in Japan and on 23 May 2005 in the United Kingdom by Parlophone and in the United States by Virgin Records. Produced by the band, Danger Mouse, Jason Cox, and James Dring, the album features contributions from De La Soul, Neneh Cherry, Martina Topley-Bird, Roots Manuva, MF Doom, Ike Turner, Bootie Brown of the Pharcyde, Shaun Ryder, and Dennis Hopper. As with the band's eponymous 2001 debut, the release of Demon Days and its respective live performances were both accompanied by various multimedia, including interactive features on the Gorillaz website, a total of four animated music videos, and animatics for select videos. Almost all visuals associated with the album were designed by Gorillaz co-creator Jamie Hewlett, under his design company Zombie Flesh Eaters.

Upon its release, Demon Days was a chart success reaching the top 10 in 22 countries. The album reached number one on the UK Albums Chart and number 6 on the US Billboard 200, and was later certified six times platinum in the UK and double platinum in the US. Outperforming their debut, the album has sold eight million copies worldwide. The album spawned the singles "Feel Good Inc.", "Dare", "Dirty Harry", "Kids with Guns", and "El Mañana". Spin ranked Demon Days as the fourth-best album of 2005, while Mojo ranked it at number eighteen on their year-end list and hailed the album as a "genre-busting, contemporary pop milestone". The NME placed the album at number 98 on their list of 100 greatest albums of the decade, and Uncut placed it at number 75 on their list of top 150 albums of the decade. Complex included it on their list of 100 Best Albums of the Complex Decade, placing it at number 43, and Spin later included it in their list of "The 300 Best Albums of 1985–2014".
In 2020, the album was included at the 100 Best Albums of the 21st Century list of Stacker, being ranked at 27.

Background
While Jamie Hewlett was working with his team on a script for a possible Gorillaz movie, Damon Albarn was still recording Think Tank with Blur. By the time Albarn was ready to start writing and recording material for the Gorillaz movie, the whole idea had already been scrapped, although ideas from the movie's script were still used, including the themes of being driven by ego and the world being trapped in an endless night. Despite this, the album's main source of inspiration actually came about as a result of Albarn's train journey from Beijing to Mongolia where he, his partner and six-year-old daughter spent a day travelling through what Albarn describes as a "weird, unspoken, forgotten part of China. It was basically dead trees as far as the eye can see," Albarn recalls. "Dust bowls, loose earth rapidly turning into desert. There are little satellite towns in the middle of these semi deserts that are absolutely on their knees. And it's the size of Europe this area. And then you wake up in the morning with this nightmare in your head and it's blue sky and beautiful sand, which looks fantastic now but was probably something else millions of years ago. And that will happen to us in our lifetime."

"Gorillaz make dark pop; that's what they always set out to achieve," Albarn said in an interview with MTV News. "The whole album kind of tells the story of the night — staying up during the night — but it's also an allegory. It's what we're living in basically, the world in a state of night."

Hewlett was excited by the prospect of a second Gorillaz album, saying, "Let's repeat the same process, but do it better. Because everyone thought it was a gimmick. If you do it again, it's no longer a gimmick, and if it works then we've proved a point. And instantly, all of us got excited".

Recording

The most obvious difference on the band's second offering is the absence of Dan "the Automator" Nakamura as the acting musical producer. Instead, Albarn reached out to Danger Mouse based on the strength of The Grey Album, which brought Danger Mouse to prominence for mixing the Beatles' The White Album and Jay-Z's The Black Album. "Dan [the Automator] wasn't busy, the project just needed a slightly different approach," Albarn explained. "Danger Mouse, in my opinion, is one of the best young producers in the world. I think the last record was a lot more simplistic. It was virgin territory — animated hip-hop, reggae, stroke-rock, Latin rock — there's a lot more intricacy with this record." For Danger Mouse, a longtime Blur (Albarn's other band) fan, the feelings of admiration and respect were mutual. "It was a no-brainer when there was interest there from Damon," Burton said. "I heard demos of the new record, but the biggest part was getting the chance to be a part of something that's so strong — you just gotta jump on it. I had a very up-and-down year [in 2004], but it was definitely a big up when I got a chance to [work with Gorillaz]."

"I learned so much working on the record with Damon", claimed Danger Mouse. "...and it was sink or swim. You just pick it up. At the end of the day, the people you're working with – whether it's the choir or string section or guitarist – are specialized in what they do. All you have to do is figure out the best thing they're doing and how it's going to fit within the context of the whole project. That goes back to putting together a song on a computer-based program. You're looking for all the parts that are going to make something sound right. It's also being able to communicate. I had done stuff before Gorillaz – like the Pelican City stuff – where I worked with musicians, so it wasn't completely foreign to me."

As on Gorillaz, there are plenty of guest collaborators including rappers De La Soul, Bootie Brown from the Pharcyde, and MF Doom along with Ike Turner on keyboards, the singer Shaun Ryder from Happy Mondays and the actor and director Dennis Hopper, who narrates a parable ("Fire Coming Out of the Monkey's Head") about innocence, greed and retribution set to a droll reggae bounce. That song leads into a stretch of ethereal vocal harmonies in a clear homage to the Beach Boys. Albarn said he couldn't make the vocal parts sound right until he had a minor revelation. "If you've ever seen the Beach Boys in footage, they're all smiling, desperately keeping the upbeat Beach Boy thing alive, while Brian Wilson is just absolutely glum as hell. So I did three harmonies smiling with my face. And then one just being really miserable, which was Brian. Now it's got that vibe."

"Kids with Guns" was inspired by a boy in Albarn's daughter's class who turned up to school with a knife. "A nice boy", said Albarn, "just decided to pick up a knife and show it to his friends at lunchtime. It's a very real problem, but I'm not treating it as a problem. It's part of the brutalisation of a generation that's going on at the moment". "Fire Coming Out of the Monkey's Head", meanwhile, is a parable read by Dennis Hopper that seems to have clear parallels with the war for oil.

Regarding the song "Dare" and the collaboration with Shaun Ryder, Albarn also said: "I love Shaun Ryder. During the whole Oasis thing, he and Bernard Sumner were the only two who cared about what I was going through. Being constantly taken the piss out of by Noel & Liam (Gallagher). How can you fight when you've got the tabloids and a working class attitude on your back? You're fucked. But Shaun was really sweet to me and made me feel a whole lot better about it. Because I did get quite upset about it, so was selecting Shaun karma in action, then? Yeah, definitely". The song's title is purported to have come about due to Ryder's thick Mancunian accent he was unable to say the phrase "It's There", which was the song's original title, so it was change simply to "Dare". Roses Gabor takes over the role of Noodle from Miho Hatori, who provided the vocals for her on the first album. Albarn provides backing vocals; however, to blend his vocals with Gabor's, his voice was toned down to be slightly covered up. Albarn's full vocalization can be heard on the D-Sides remix album. D-Sides features a demo version of "Dare" entitled "People". This version contains the same background beat while lacking the majority of the keyboards and effects in the final recording. Unlike the final version, it is completely sung by Albarn and features an Omnichord breakdown.

Rapper Roots Manuva and Martina Topley-Bird appear on the track "All Alone" (the instrumental of which was partially recorded in Africa) and also recorded another track entitled "Snakes and Ladders". The track does not appear on the album or D-Sides, however, the track was sampled by Topley-Bird for her song "Soldier Boy", which appears as a B-side for her song "Poison" which features Roots Manuva and features a production credit for Gorillaz. The track can be heard partially on the Gorillaz documentary-film Bananaz, and is also sampled on the track "Intro".

Musical style and themes
Sputnikmusic wrote that the album's style "is a strong foray into the melding of hip hop into pop and rock music." Odyssey said that the album was "apocalyptic dark pop at its finest, strangest, and most topical". Vice called the album a "British pop masterpiece", and wrote that its music "flits between UK rap, alternative rock, piano-pop, trip-hop, reggae, and Beach Boys psychedelia". The Unapologists called the album "both a typical post-9/11 political statement and mid-2000s alt-rock masterpiece". Spin described the album as a "slinky folk-disco-hip-hop-Afro-pop-punk expedition". Robert Christgau labelled the album "pop trip-hop", while Happy Mag listed it as a key work in the art rock style.

Demon Days prominently makes use of string sections, which were organized under the lead of Isabelle Dunn, who formed Demon Strings for the album and its later live performances. Choirs are also incorporated, including the San Fernandez Youth Chorus on "Dirty Harry", and the London Community Gospel Choir on the album's final two tracks, "Don't Get Lost in Heaven" and "Demon Days".

Albarn has said that the album is meant to be a depiction of a journey through the night in which each track represents a confrontation with a personal "demon". The album also has many lyrical themes centered on the destruction humans are causing worldwide; speaking about the track "Fire Coming Out of the Monkey's Head", Albarn explained, "That came from a very naive idea, which is: what is going to happen when they've taken all of the oil out of the earth? Aren't there going to be these vast holes? Surely those holes shouldn't be empty. Surely there is a reason why they had all of this in. It's like bad plastic surgery, eventually it collapses." Mike Schiller of PopMatters wrote that Demon Days "[provides] its listeners not with a story arc, but a "music arc" [which] starts off slow, and honestly, not all that strange", describing the first few tracks as "[sounding] a bit like the Casioed version of a mid-'90s trip-hop album." The album's opener, "Intro" contains a sample from "Dark Earth", from the soundtrack to the 1978 film Dawn of the Dead.

Release and marketing
Demon Days was first mentioned in articles detailing the reopening of Gorillaz' website in early December 2004. Initially, a March or April 2005 release date was announced, but this date was later pushed back. In an article for Q in February 2005, it was reported that the album was to be titled We Are Happy Landfill. Another early title was reported to be Reject False Icons, which is also the title of Gorillaz' culture jamming project. In January 2005, a promo for the song "Dirty Harry" was released as a white label 12", and an exclusive video was released online entitled "Rock It". It was later reported that the track would not appear on the album, although it later appeared on D-Sides, a collection of remixes, rare songs and B-sides released in November 2007. Demon Days''' lead single "Feel Good Inc." became Gorillaz' biggest hit at the time, while the album's second single, "Dare" featuring Shaun Ryder, was a big hit as well and gave the band their first number one single in the UK. Since its release, Demon Days has been certified double platinum in the US and 6× platinum in the UK. It was also certified Gold in Japan.

The limited edition of the album includes a DVD containing the video, audio commentary and an animatic for the music video "Feel Good Inc.", short animated films featuring the band, an exclusive audio track titled "The Swagga" and online access to exclusive sections of the band's website, with various wallpapers and screensavers, as well as a crowbar, facilitating the opening of a locked cupboard in the kitchen on Gorillaz.com in order to download the song, "Happy Landfill". This content is no longer available, however, the track appears on D-Sides (re-titled "We Are Happy Landfill").

Reject False Icons
The phrase "Reject False Icons" was first mentioned on 24 November 2004 on a Gorillaz mail out to fans. On 8 December, the Gorillaz website was re-opened with a brand new music video, "Rockit", which has the saying "Reject False Icons" at the end. On 19 December, the "Reject False Icons" campaign kicked off with the launch of rejectfalseicons.com. Fans could submit their photos of ways to spread the message by using graffiti or by sticking "Reject False Icons" stickers that were available for a limited period from the site and from selected record shops in the UK.

Search for a Star
In December 2004, Gorillaz launched their own talent contest, Search for a Star, to find an artist to collaborate with. There were on average over 100 entries per week whittled down to around 10 to be put forward for the public vote. The 200+ entries were viewed over a million times. A gallery room was added to Kong Studios which displayed all of the entries. Gorillaz' competition was initially run to pick just one winner from entries submitted to Gorillaz.com. However, at the end of the competition, it was announced that two further entries – one from the submitted images, and one from the submitted audio files – would be chosen by online vote.

All three collaborated on the fourth single release of Phase Two, "Kids with Guns" / "El Mañana". Sourbee provided his animated incarnation of the "Don't Get Lost in Heaven (Original Demo Version)" B-side, featured on the DVD version of the single. Asidus made a "Dirty Harry" remix called "Uno Quatro" featured on the Gorillaz website. Irina Bolshakova aka Schneeflocke created her own artistic interpretation of "El Mañana", featured on an insert included on the DVD version of the single. The winners were also originally supposed to have their own rooms in Kong Studios, but that never came to pass.

Reception

At Metacritic, which assigns a normalized rating out of 100 to reviews from mainstream critics, Demon Days received an average score of 82, indicating "universal acclaim". AllMusic editor Stephen Thomas Erlewine wrote that Demon Days "is unified and purposeful in a way Albarn's music hasn't been since The Great Escape" and "stands alongside the best Blur albums, providing a tonal touchstone for this decade the way Parklife did for the '90s." Paul Mardles of The Observer felt that, compared to Gorillaz, the songs on Demon Days were more "fully realised and pregnant with ideas", and that the album may prove to be Albarn's "masterwork". Writing in Entertainment Weekly, David Browne called it "spookier, blippier, and more on edge." Los Angeles Times critic Robert Hilburn stated that Albarn's "evocative words, compelling if understated melodic sense and subdued vocals" are at the emotional center of Demon Days, "transcending the gimmick even more than on the first Gorillaz album."

Rob Mitchum of Pitchfork felt that while Demon Days was uneven, Albarn's experiments "fit together just often enough to again make Gorillaz more than mere Adult Swim novelty." In a mixed assessment, Alex Mar of Rolling Stone described Demon Days as "hit-or-miss" and felt that Albarn's "phoned-in and incredibly flat" vocals weighed the record down. In contrast, Uncut stated that the album featured "great beats, brilliant production, top tunes and some of Albarn's best singing." Robert Christgau of The Village Voice gave Demon Days a three-star honourable mention, indicating "an enjoyable effort consumers attuned to its overriding aesthetic or individual vision may well treasure", and selected "All Alone" and "Dare" as highlights.

 Accolades 

"Feel Good Inc.", the lead single from Demon Days, won the Best Pop Collaboration with Vocals accolade at the 48th Grammy Awards. The album was nominated for British Album of the Year at the 2006 Brit Awards, but lost to Coldplay's X&Y. Demon Days won the accolade for Best International Album at 2006 Danish Music Awards and made the band win the accolade for Best Group at 2005 MTV Europe Music Awards.Demon Days was voted the 21st best album of the year in The Village Voices annual Pazz & Jop critics poll for 2005. The album was chosen as the tenth best album of 2005 by NME and the 2nd one for Q magazine. Glide Magazine listed the album on its Best Albums of the Decade, ranking it at 46. Spin ranked Demon Days as the fourth best album of 2005, while Mojo ranked it at number eighteen on their year-end list and hailed the album as a "genre-busting, contemporary pop milestone." NME placed it 98th on their list of 100 greatest albums of the decade. Uncut ranked it at 75 on their list of top 150 albums of the decade. Complex included it on their list of 100 Best Albums of the Complex Decade, placing it at number 43. The Guardian listed the album on its Top 50 Albums of the decade, ranking it at 11. Spin later included it in their list of The 300 Best Albums of 1985–2014. In 2016, Q ranked Demon Days as one of The Greatest Albums of the Last 30 Years. In 2020, the album was included at the 100 Best Albums of the 21st Century list of Stacker, being ranked at 27.

Legacy

Despite its only modestly positive reception at release, Demon Days is now considered to have left an indelible mark on alternative music and has since been variously hailed as "iconic", "classic", "timeless" and a "modern masterpiece".

Multiple writers have noted how Demon Days' commentary was prescient for outlining social and environmental issues in the following years of the 21st century. In an eleventh-anniversary retrospective, Angus Harrison wrote for Noisey UK that while at the time the record was perceived as "corny, ranty, and hysterical," and even "pretentious twaddle," it is now viewed as "scarily prescient" and "a thrilling allegory set on the precipice of an increasingly dark stretch of modern history." In Vinyl Me, Please's Liner Notes series, Kyle Kramer called the "tormented, large-scale questions" of the album "more relevant than ever," whether in "2017 or much further down the line." John of audiosnobbery pens that "this doomsday scenario was simply viewed as a self-indulgent and pretentious move from Albarn, but, 14 years later, the messages and problems explored in Demon Days are more pertinent than ever: overpopulation, false gods, guns, violence, depression, corruption and greed. The world is not better than it was, and this is precisely why listening to Demon Days today is even more interesting than in 2005 – these are the true Demon Days." Hatim Hafid of River Beats Dance describes that "Demon Days acts as a direct societal critique on colonialism and invasion. It highlights the negative practices used to exploit countries in the name of democracy and peace", and "...Demon Days remains as one of the most politically charged pieces of the era." Tim Karan of Diffuser has called Demon Days as "one of the most innovative albums of the 21st century". He also classified the album as "dense and atmospheric". Sean Craig from Mixed Frequencies said that Demon Days is "as dense as a 50-minute album can be, packed with hit after hit, feature after feature, and changes in musical style so fast that it can give you whiplash if you're not prepared for it. It's a dark, apocalyptic album that brims with energy and funk, a pop music oxymoron in every fiber of its being. It's an idiosyncrasy made manifest, something that uses sounds from every possible corner of the musical world and blends them together, in turn sounding almost entirely its own."

Artists including Kali Uchis, ASAP Rocky, and Trippie Redd have suggested Demon Days specifically as an influence on their work (among many others who have cited the project as a whole), with the latter saying it provides him with inspiration to create "timeless" work. Mura Masa commented how Demon Days has influenced him to invite Damon Albarn to work in his track "Blu": "...Demon Days was the first album I bought, so getting to meet up and actually work with him was crazy."

The music videos for singles from Demon Days, "Feel Good Inc.", "Dare", and "El Mañana" have amassed millions of views on YouTube; in 2011, Rolling Stone clocked "Feel Good Inc." as the 99th best song of the 2000s. In 2020, the song "Dirty Harry" trended on video-sharing platform TikTok, featured by users conceptualizing themselves as cartoon characters (referencing Gorillaz' virtual nature).

Track listing

Personnel
Credits adapted from the liner notes of Demon Days.

Musicians

 Damon Albarn – lead vocals, keyboards, acoustic guitar, synthesizers, melodica
 Danger Mouse – percussion, drum programming, sampled loops
 Jason Cox – drums, drum programming
 James Dring – drums, drum programming
 Cass Browne – drums
 Simon Tong – additional guitar 
 Sally Jackson – violin 
 Stella Page – viola 	
 Amanda Drummond – viola 
 Isabelle Dunn – cello 
 Al Mobbs – double bass 
 Emma Smith – double bass 
 Prabjote Osahn – violin 
 Neneh Cherry – additional vocals 
 Bootie Brown – vocals 
 The San Fernandez Youth Chorus – choir 
 De La Soul – vocals 
 Antonia Pagulatos – violin 
 Ike Turner – piano 
 MF Doom – vocals 
 Roots Manuva – vocals 
 Martina Topley-Bird – vocals 
 Shaun Ryder – vocals 
 Rosie Wilson – vocals 
 Dennis Hopper – vocals 
 London Community Gospel Choir – choir 

Technical
 Gorillaz – production
 Brian Burton – mixing, production
 Jason Cox – engineering, mixing, production
 James Dring – production
 Steve Sedgwick – mixing assistance
 Howie Weinberg – mastering

Artwork
 J.C. Hewlett – artwork, design
 Zombie Flesh Eaters – artwork, design

Singles
"Feel Good Inc." was the first single released from the album. It was released as a single in the UK and Australia on 9 May 2005, and charted at number two in the UK, number 14 on the Billboard Hot 100 and number one on the Billboard Hot Modern Rock Tracks.
"Dare" was the second single released from the album. It was released on 29 August 2005 in the UK. The single charted at number one on the UK Singles Chart, number eight on the Billboard Modern Rock Tracks and number 87 on the Billboard'' Hot 100.
"Dirty Harry" was the third single released from the album. It was released on 21 November 2005 in the UK, and charted at number six on the UK Singles Chart.
"Kids with Guns" / "El Mañana" was the fourth and final single released from the album. It was released on 10 April 2006 in the UK. The winners for the Search for a Star competition collaborated with Gorillaz in various ways on the single. The single charted at number 27 on the UK Singles Chart.

Charts

Weekly charts

Year-end charts

Decade-end charts

Certifications

References

External links

2005 albums
Gorillaz albums
Albums produced by Damon Albarn
Albums produced by Danger Mouse (musician)
Albums recorded at Studio 13
Hip hop albums by English artists
Concept albums
Parlophone albums
Virgin Records albums